Clyde High School (CHS) is a public high school in Clyde, Ohio, United States.  It is the only high school in the Clyde–Green Springs Schools and mainly serves students from the city of Clyde, the village of Green Springs, and the surrounding area in southern Sandusky and northern Seneca counties.  Athletic teams are known as the Fliers and the school colors are blue and gold.

Facilities
In 2010, Clyde High School was renovated with funding from the Ohio School Facilities Commission and local voters.  Upgrades to the building included an auxiliary gymnasium, additional administrative office space, whole-building air conditioning, an enlarged cafeteria, and a new main entrance to the school.

A new wing was added to the building in the late 1990s, including updated science labs, a new media center, and additional classrooms and lockers.  This addition was funded with a voter levy.

In 2005, the school received a performing arts wing, including rehearsal rooms for bands and choirs and an auditorium, which seats over 800 — enough for the entire CHS student body. The space was funded by private donation pledges and a voter levy. It replaced the auditorium that stood at the old McPherson Middle School, which was constructed in 1912.

Athletics
Clyde competes in the Ohio High School Athletic Association (OHSAA) as a member of the Sandusky Bay Conference.

State championships
 Football – 1995, 2019  
 Wrestling – 1995 
 Boys track and field – 1953

Notable alumni
 Tim Anderson - Professional football player in the National Football League (NFL)

Notes and references

External links
 District website

High schools in Sandusky County, Ohio
Public high schools in Ohio
High School